"Chura Liya Hai Tumne Jo Dil Ko" (Hindi: चुरा लिया है तुमने जो दिल को, "That You’ve Stolen This Heart") is an Indian Hindi song from the 1973 Bollywood film Yaadon Ki Baraat. It was sung by Asha Bhosle and Mohammad Rafi. The song was picturized on Vikas Anand and Zeenat Aman. It was written by Majrooh Sultanpuri and composed by R. D. Burman. The guitar on this song was played by Bhupinder Singh. It has been remixed and sampled by many other artists.

The song was a hit in the 1970s, and gained cult status in India. In 2020, Asha Bhosle named this song as one of her most favourite songs. The song was picked by Pinkvilla by one of the most iconic songs of Asha Bhosle on her 89th birthday.

Cultural impact
In 2022, Pakistani politician Maryam Nawaz sang this song on her son's wedding ceremony.

In 2022, the song was performed by Indian TV actress Ashi singh on Valentine's Day.

Versions

This song has been remade and re-sung by many artists including Indian Idol Season 12 contestant Shanmukhapriya. She was trolled by some listeners for her poor rendition of the song.

References

External links
 Watch the song.

1973 songs
Indian songs
Hindi film songs
Songs with music by R. D. Burman
Asha Bhosle songs
Mohammed Rafi songs